Drüber is a southern suburb (Ortsteil) of the town of Einbeck, district Northeim. It has 456 inhabitants (2021).

Geography
Drüber lies in southern Lower Saxony between the Harz and Solling Mountains. It is located 1 km west of the river Leine, at the western edge of the Leine Graben in the Leine Uplands. The village is immediately west of the nature reserve that is located in the flood retention basin Salzderhelden. It is situated roughly midway between the cities Einbeck and Northeim. The size of the village is 880 acres. Its neighboring villages are Sülbeck to the north, in the east Hohnstedt on the far side of the river Leine. South of Drüber is Stöckheim and Buensen is located to the west.

History
Written records about Drüber start relatively late. In a deed from 1238 given by Otto I, Duke of Brunswick-Lüneburg a certain Ludolf von Drübere is mentioned.  Due to its name it is thought that Drüber might be one of the oldest villages in the area.  In 1886 a cooperative dairy was opened in Drüber by farmers from the villages around it. In 1970 that dairy was closed. On 1 December 1, 1962 a central school for the villages Buensen, Drüber, Hollenstedt, Immensen, and Sülbeck started operation. Before that time only single classroom schools were used in these villages. The school was enlarged over time and is still operating under the name "Leinetalschulen" (Leine-Valley-Schools).

On 1. March 1974 the village was incorporated into the city of Einbeck.

Politics

Village Council Drüber/Sülbeck
Mayor of the village is Andreas Mann. The current legislative period started 2021.

There is a joint Village Council with Sülbeck. Election results for the Village Council in 2021 are:

Wählergemeinschaft Drüber-Sülbeck Nine Seats

Coat of Arms of Drüber
The coat of arms shows three green trees above a canal (Salzgraben) that ran around Drüber to supply the salt works in Sülbeck with water.

References

Literature
 Einbecker Geschichtsverein e. V. (Hrsg.): Einbecks Dörfer - Bilder aus vergangenen Zeiten. Duderstadt 1995.

External links
Homepage of the City of Einbeck with information about the suburb Drüber 
Homepage of Heimatverein Leinetal e.V. with information and photos from Drüber 

Einbeck